Kent Peak can refer to:
Kent Peak (Boulder Mountains, Idaho), on the border of Blaine and Custer counties
Kent Peak (Boundary County, Idaho)
Kent Peak (Ravalli County, Montana)